Dare or Daré is both a surname and a given name. Notable people with the name include:

Surname:
Airton Daré (born 1978), Brazilian race car driver
Alison Dare (born 1965), South African field hockey player
Ananias Dare (c.1560– c.1587?), British tiler and bricklayer, member of the Roanoke Colony; husband of Eleanor Dare and father of Virginia Dare
Arthur N. Dare (1850–1923), American Republican politician of Minnesota
Barbara Dare (born 1963), American pornographic actress
Bill Dare, British radio writer
Billy Dare (1927–1994), English footballer
Charles Dare (1854–1924), British naval officer
Danny Dare (1905–1996), American choreographer, actor, director, writer
Dorothy Dare (1911–1981), American actress and singer
Eleanor Dare (c.1563–c.1599?), English colonist and member of the Roanoke Colony; mother of Virginia Dare
Elkanah Kelsey Dare (1782–1826), American composer
Irene Dare, young American figure skater and film star
Johnny Dare, American radio personality
Joseph Dare (footballer) (born 1991), Australian rules footballer
Joseph Dare (minister) (1831–1880), Australian Wesleyan Church leader
Kevin Dare (born 1959), English footballer
Leona Dare (1854/55–1922), American circus performer
Michael Dare (born 1917), Canadian general
Norm Dare (born 1948), Australian rules footballer
Phyllis Dare (1890–1975), English singer and actress
Reginald Dare (1921–1993), English cricketer and footballer
Tessa Dare, American writer, a New York Times and USA Today bestselling historical romance novelist
Virginia Dare (1587-?), first child born in the Americas to English parents
Yinka Dare (1972–2004), Nigerian National Basketball Association player
Zena Dare (1887–1975), English singer and actress; sister of Phyllis Dare
Dan Dare (disambiguation), several fictional characters

Given name:
Daré Nibombé (born 1980), footballer from Togo
Dare Vršič (born 1984), Slovenian footballer
Dare Wright (born 1914), Canadian-American photographer and author